= Aaron Kofsky =

Aaron Kofsky is a close adviser of vice president JD Vance who attracted attention in October 2024, when Wired published an investigation linking Kofsky to a Reddit account that repeatedly posted about using various psychoactive drugs.
